The Ministry of Agricultural Development of the Republic of Somaliland (MoAD)   is a government ministry of Somaliland responsible for agriculture. The ministry is responsible for formulating and implementing  the agricultural policies, forestry, water resources, irrigation, promotion and development of farmers and cooperative systems. The current minister is Mohamed Haji Osman  .

Ministers

See also
 Politics of Somaliland
 Cabinet of Somaliland

References

External links
Official Site of the Government of Somaliland

Politics of Somaliland
Government ministries of Somaliland